West Germany (Federal Republic of Germany) competed at the 1976 Winter Olympics in Innsbruck, Austria.

Medalists

Alpine skiing

Men

Women

Biathlon

Men

1One minute added per close miss (a hit in the outer ring), two minutes added per complete miss.

Men's 4 x 7.5 km relay

2A penalty loop of 200 metres had to be skied per missed target.

Bobsleigh

Cross-country skiing

Men

Men's 4 × 10 km relay

Women

Figure skating

Women

Pairs

Ice hockey

First round
Winners (in bold) entered the Medal Round. Other teams played a consolation round for 7th-12th places.

|}

Medal round

West Germany 7-4 Poland
Finland 5-3 West Germany
USSR 7-3 West Germany
Czechoslovakia 7-4 West Germany
West Germany 4-1 USA

Leading scorers

Team roster
Erich Weißhaupt
Anton Kehle
Rudolf Thanner
Josef Volk
Udo Kiessling
Stefan Metz
Klaus Auhuber
Ignaz Berndaner
Rainer Phillip
Lorenz Funk
Wolfgang Boos
Ernst Köpf, Sr.
Ferenc Vozar
Walter Koberle
Erich Kühnhackl
Alois Schloder
Martin Hinterstocker
Franz Reindl
Head coach: Xaver Unsinn

Luge

Men

(Men's) Doubles

Women

Nordic combined 

Events:
 normal hill ski jumping (Three jumps, best two counted and shown here.)
 15 km cross-country skiing

Ski jumping

Speed skating

Men

Women

References
Official Olympic Reports
International Olympic Committee results database
 Olympic Winter Games 1976, full results by sports-reference.com

Germany, West
1976
Winter Olympics